Taungbon() is a village in Ye Township in the Mon State of south-east Burma. It is located north-west of Ye city. Most of people are Mon people.

External links
Satellite map at Maplandia.com

Populated places in Mon State